Sindora javanica is a species of plant in the family Fabaceae. It is a tree endemic to Java in Indonesia.

References

javanica
Vulnerable plants
Endemic flora of Java
Taxonomy articles created by Polbot